The F-4EAT was a 4-speed, electronically controlled automatic transmission developed by Mazda and JATCO starting in 1990. It was also later produced by Ford Motor Company from 1991 to 2003, to replace the aging, 3-speed/hydraulic controlled ATX. It is referred to as the F4A-EL by Mazda and Kia who also used this transmission. This transmission is an updated Mazda F3A transmission, 3 speed hydraulic controlled transmission. The F-4EAT uses electronic, computer controls, a 4th gear overdrive, has a lock-up torque converter and differential. It used a computer-controlled speed sensor for the speedometer.

Applications
Ford Motor Company
 1991–1996 Ford Laser (EU AUS & NZ)
 1991–2002 Ford Escort
 1998–2003 Ford ZX2
 1993–1997 Ford Probe
 1991–1999 Mercury Tracer
 1991–1994 Mercury Capri
Mazda
 1990–2003 Mazda Protege
 1993 Mazda 626 LX V6/ES V6
 1990–1994 Mazda 323
 1992–1995 Mazda MX-3
 1995–2001 Mazda Millenia (non-Miller cycle engine)
 1999–2001 Mazda MPV 2.5 Duratec (non-3.0 Duratec)
 2007–2012 Ford Escape (ZC, ZD series, 2.3 L Duratec)
 also known to be used in Mazda Xedos 6 and Mazda Xedos 9
Kia
 1994–2001 Kia Sephia
 2000–2003 Kia Spectra
 2000–2005 Kia Rio

See also 
 List of Ford transmissions
 List of Mazda transmissions

Ford transmissions
F3A